Homoeosoma caradjellum is a species of snout moth in the genus Homoeosoma. It was described by Roesler in 1965. It is found in the Russian Far East.

References

Moths described in 1965
Phycitini